"Drugs & the Internet" is a song by American singer and songwriter Lauv, released as a single on April 25, 2019. It was the second single for his debut studio album, How I'm Feeling (2020). The song was Lauv's first single since his January 2019 collaboration with Troye Sivan, "I'm So Tired...".

Background and composition
Speaking of the song, Lauv stated:

Lauv wrote the song while he was feeling emptiness and depression. It begins as a piano ballad before breaking into a bass-heavy beat. The song's lyrics discuss self-perception and identity.

Music video
The music video was directed by Jenna Marsh. The video features the singer getting sucked into social media, and it has been compared to the British science fiction anthology television series Black Mirror. It was produced by Operator Media and Meaning production.

Track listing

Charts

References

2019 singles
Lauv songs
Songs written by Lauv
Songs written by Michael Pollack (musician)
Songs written by Jon Bellion
2019 songs